Marco Coledan (born 22 August 1988) is an Italian former road and track racing cyclist, who rode professionally between 2012 and 2018 for the ,  and  teams. He participated in four Grand Tours: the Giro d'Italia in 2012, 2015, 2016 and 2018.

Major results

2006
 1st  Individual pursuit, UEC European Junior Track Championships
2007
 3rd Time trial, National Under-23 Road Championships
2008
 3rd  Individual pursuit, UEC European Under-23 Track Championships
2009
 1st Stage 1 Giro della Regione Friuli Venezia Giulia
 6th Memorial Davide Fardelli
2010
 3rd  Individual pursuit, UEC European Under-23 Track Championships
2011
 6th Circuito del Porto
2012
 1st Stage 1b (TTT) Monviso-Venezia — Il Padania
2013
 1st  Individual pursuit, 2013–14 UCI Track Cycling World Cup, Manchester
 3rd  Team pursuit, 2012–13 UCI Track Cycling World Cup, Aguascalientes
2014
 1st Six Days of Fiorenzuola (with Alex Buttazzoni)
2015
 1st Stage 1 (TTT) Tour of Alberta
 2nd  Madison, UCI Track World Championships (with Elia Viviani)
2016
 5th Road race, National Road Championships
2018
 1st Stage 8 Tour du Maroc

Grand Tour general classification results timeline

References

External links

1988 births
Living people
Italian male cyclists
Cyclists from the Province of Treviso